Zhe with breve (Ӂ ӂ; italics: Ӂ ӂ) is a letter of the Cyrillic script, created by Soviet linguists for the cyrillization of Slavic languages. Its form is derived from the Cyrillic letter Zhe (Ж ж Ж ж) by an addition of a Breve. Its pronunciation is similar to the English pronunciation of J j.

Zhe with breve is used in the alphabets of the following language:

Computing codes

See also
Cyrillic characters in Unicode
Moldovan Cyrillic alphabet

External links
 Moldovan Cyrillic alphabet and pronunciation

References

Gagauz language
Moldovan language
Cyrillic letters with diacritics
Letters with breve